Double Up is the eighth studio album by American singer-songwriter R. Kelly. It was released by Jive Records on May 29, 2007 in the United States, with distribution handled by Zomba Label Group. The album features the contributions with guest appearances and also the productions, which was handled by R. Kelly, along with Swizz Beatz, The Runners, Snoop Dogg, Khao, Nelly, Chamillionaire and Polow da Don.

Its lead single, his remix to "I'm a Flirt", which features guest vocals from American rapper T.I. and American recording artist T-Pain; attaining the prominence of the success on the Billboard Top 40 charts, while it peaked at number one on the US Top Hot Rap Tracks chart.

Background 
On YouTube, R. Kelly has a video of him speaking out about his state on his success and his thoughts of collaborating with artists, such Young Jeezy and Ludacris, he thought, "why not put some of that magic on my album?" He stated that 70 percent of the record will be uptempo but he assured fans that "there will be some slow jams on there."

Promotion and release 
Prior to the album's release, three songs were leaked onto the Internet: second single "Same Girl", which features Usher; "Rise Up", a song which only appeared on some releases, a tribute to the victims of the Virginia Tech massacre in April 2007; also making an early appearance was a song titled "Blow It Up", at first supposed to be featured on the album but absent from the final track listing, mainly due to the inappropriate mood it would have created because of the presence of the Virginia Tech shooting tribute song "Rise Up". "Rock Star", which features Ludacris and Kid Rock, was released as the album's third single on September 4. A video for the song "Real Talk" was also made directly on YouTube. On May 25, 2007, four days before the album's release, the explicit version of the album became available for purchase on iTunes. The edited version became available on May 29, 2007, with a bonus track version available a day later.

Chart performance
The album debuted at number one on the US Billboard 200, with first-week sales of 386,000 copies, making this his sixth and final album in his career to debut at number-one. To date, the album has sold 1,200,000 copies in the United States. On June 3, 2007 it entered the UK Albums Chart at #10.

Track listing 

Samples credits
 "Double Up" samples "Iceberg" performed by Tweet

Notes
 There are different iTunes versions of Double Up. Some features the track "Ringtone", as track 19; instead of 20 as on the physical version of the album. Other versions have "I Like Love" or the video for "I'm a Flirt" as bonus features.
 On all versions (digital and CD) of Double Up, "I'm a Flirt" is presented in its censored form while the other songs are not.
 On most international versions of the album, the song "Rise Up" is omitted in favor of the aforementioned bonus tracks. The song "Rise Up" was reportedly intended predominantly for North American listeners because it is about the Virginia Tech massacre, something that some non-North American fans of R. Kelly may be unfamiliar with.
 The extended version of the song "Get Dirty" with an extended verse by Chamillionaire was released on R. Kelly's MySpace page.

Chart positions

Weekly charts

Year-end charts

Certifications

See also
List of Billboard 200 number-one albums of 2007
List of Billboard number-one R&B/hip-hop albums of 2007

References

External links
'R. Kelly Previews New Album On The Phone'
'Album Credits At The Vault, Dubcc.com'
'R Kelly's Double Up Review'
 R Kelly Forums
 The R. Kelly Double Up Official Website

2007 albums
R. Kelly albums
Jive Records albums
Albums produced by R. Kelly
Albums produced by Polow da Don
Albums produced by the Runners